Dancesport at the 2018 Summer Youth Olympics was held from 7 to 11 October. The competition took place at Puerto Madero in Buenos Aires, Argentina. This marked the debut of the sport at the Youth Olympics. The discipline of street dance (breakdancing) was held at the games.

Qualification

Each National Olympic Committee (NOC) can enter a maximum of 2 competitors, 1 per each gender. As hosts, Argentina is given 2 quotas, 1 per each gender provided that they participate at the World Youth Breaking Championships. Four quotas, two per gender were initially to be decided by the tripartite committee, however, none were selected and the spots were reallocated to the 2018 World Youth Championship. The remaining places were decided at the 2018 World Youth Breaking Championship, with each continent guaranteed a spot at the games provided that they competed. There were no athletes from Africa or Oceania competing in B-Girls and Australia declined its quota in B-Boys.

To be eligible to participate at the Youth Olympics athletes must have been born between 1 January 2000 and 31 December 2002.

B-Boys

 Continental Quota

B-Girls

Medal summary

Medal table

Events

References

External links
Official Results Book – Breaking

 
2018 Summer Youth Olympics events
2018